Lanzhoudong (Lanzhou East) railway station is a station in Lanzhou, Gansu. The station is mainly used as a marshalling yard, only two local passenger trains a day stop at the station.

History
The station was established in 1952.

See also
Lanzhou railway station
Lanzhou West railway station

References

Railway stations in Gansu
Stations on the Longhai Railway
1952 establishments in China
Railway stations in China opened in 1952